{{DISPLAYTITLE:C5H9N}}
The molecular formula C5H9N (molar mass: 83.1317 g/mol, exact mass: 83.073499) may refer to:

 Pentanenitrile, n-BuCN, i.e. C4H9–C≡N
 Pivalonitrile, t-BuCN, i.e. (CH3)3C–C≡N
 tert-Butyl isocyanide, t-BuNC, i.e. (CH3)3C–N+≡C:−
 Tetrahydropyridine